Under the Black Eagle is a 1928 American silent World War I drama film directed by W. S. Van Dyke, written by Norman Houston, Bradley King, and Madeleine Ruthven, and starring Ralph Forbes, Marceline Day, Bert Roach, William Fairbanks, and Marc McDermott. The film was released on March 24, 1928, by Metro-Goldwyn-Mayer.

Cast 
Ralph Forbes as Karl von Zorn
Marceline Day as Margareta
Bert Roach as Hans Schmidt
William Fairbanks as Ulrich Muller
Marc McDermott as Col. Luden
Flash the Dog as Prinz

Preservation
A surviving late silent from 'Woody' Van Dyke, listed as being preserved at the EYE Film Institute Netherlands (Filmmuseum).

References

External links 

Stills at silentfilmstillarchive.com

1928 films
1920s English-language films
Silent American drama films
1928 drama films
Metro-Goldwyn-Mayer films
Films directed by W. S. Van Dyke
American black-and-white films
American silent feature films
1920s American films